Fatoumata Yarie Camara (born 15 February 1996) is a Guinean freestyle wrestler. She represented Guinea at the 2019 African Games and she won the bronze medal in the women's freestyle 62 kg event. She won the silver medal in the 62 kg event at the 2021 Islamic Solidarity Games held in Konya, Turkey.

Career 

She competed in the women's 65 kg event at the 2019 World Wrestling Championships held in Nur-Sultan, Kazakhstan.

She qualified at the 2021 African & Oceania Wrestling Olympic Qualification Tournament to represent Guinea at the 2020 Summer Olympics in Tokyo, Japan. She competed in the women's 57 kg event.

She won the bronze medal in her event at the 2022 African Wrestling Championships held in El Jadida, Morocco.

She won the silver medal in the 62 kg event at the 2021 Islamic Solidarity Games held in Konya, Turkey.

Achievements

References

External links 
 
 
 

1996 births
Living people
Place of birth missing (living people)
Guinean female sport wrestlers
African Games bronze medalists for Guinea
African Games medalists in wrestling
Competitors at the 2019 African Games
Wrestlers at the 2020 Summer Olympics
Olympic wrestlers of Guinea
African Wrestling Championships medalists
Islamic Solidarity Games medalists in wrestling
Islamic Solidarity Games competitors for Guinea